Oenopota harveyi is a species of sea snail, a marine gastropod mollusk in the family Mangeliidae.

This species is considered a nomen dubium.

Description
Th length of the shell attains 6 mm.

Distribution
This marine species occurs off Newfoundland, Canada.

References

 Verkruzen, T. A. 1878. Zur Fauna von Neu-Schottland (Nova Scotia) und Neufundland Jahrbücher der Deutschen Malakozoologischen Gesellschaft 5 208–230.

External links
  Tucker, J.K. 2004 Catalog of recent and fossil turrids (Mollusca: Gastropoda). Zootaxa 682:1-1295.

harveyi
Gastropods described in 1878